This was the third time India participated in Commonwealth Games. India did not participate in Previous Games in New Zealand.  This time also India participated in very few events, mainly in Athletics only. Again, India failed to win single Medal in these games.

References

Nations at the 1954 British Empire and Commonwealth Games
India at the Commonwealth Games
1954 in Indian sport